Fred, Freddie, or Frederick Hill may refer to:

Sports
 Fred Hill (rugby league), English rugby league footballer
 Fred Hill (baseball) (1900–?), American baseball player
 Freddie Hill (footballer, born 1914), Welsh footballer
 Fred Hill (Australian footballer) (1927–2020), Australian rules footballer
 Fred Hill (coach) (1934–2019), American college baseball coach
 Fred Hill (footballer, born 1940) (1940–2021), English footballer
 Fred Hill (American football) (born 1943), American football player
 Fred Hill (basketball) (born 1959), American college basketball coach
 Frederick Hill (cricketer), English cricketer and clergyman

Others
 Frederick Hill (musician), of Loughborough, York, and Elmfield College
 Frederick Hill (politician) Florida state legislator
 Fred Hill (activist) (1909–1984), British activist who protested against the compulsory wearing of crash helmets on motorcycles
 Frederick William Hill, British military engineer

See also
 Hill (surname)